The Wind's Twelve Quarters is a collection of short stories by American writer Ursula K. Le Guin, named after a line from A. E. Housman's A Shropshire Lad and first published by Harper & Row in 1975. Described by Le Guin as a retrospective, it collects 17 previously published stories, four of which were the germ of novels she was to write later: "The Word of Unbinding" and "The Rule of Names" gave Le Guin the place that was to become Earthsea; "Semley's Necklace" was first published as "Dowry of the Angyar" in 1964 and then as the Prologue of the novel Rocannon's World in 1966; "Winter's King" is about the inhabitants of the planet Winter, as is Le Guin's later novel The Left Hand of Darkness. Most of the other stories are also connected to Le Guin's novels.  The story "The Ones Who Walk Away from Omelas" won the Hugo Award in 1974, while "The Day Before the Revolution" won the Locus and Nebula Awards in 1975.

Contents
Foreword
"Semley's Necklace"
"April in Paris"
"The Masters"
"Darkness Box"
"The Word of Unbinding"
"The Rule of Names"
"Winter's King"
"The Good Trip"
"Nine Lives"
"Things"
"A Trip to the Head"
"Vaster than Empires and More Slow"
"The Stars Below"
"The Field of Vision"
"Direction of the Road"
"The Ones Who Walk Away from Omelas"
"The Day Before the Revolution"

See also
Classical compass winds - the phrase refers to the Classical 12-point wind rose, not the later mariners' rose of 8, 16, or 32

References

1975 short story collections
Fantasy short story collections
Short story collections by Ursula K. Le Guin
Earthsea short stories
Hainish Cycle
Harper & Row books